William Alvan Faul (April 21, 1940 – February 21, 2002) was an American Major League Baseball player, a right-handed pitcher for the Detroit Tigers, Chicago Cubs and San Francisco Giants (1962–66; 1970).

Born in Cincinnati, Faul attended Goshen High School. Playing alongside his brother Jerry, Faul helped Goshen win the 1958 Ohio state baseball championship, then he played baseball at the University of Cincinnati, where he set the school's strikeout record and once fanned 24 batters in a game.

Baseball career
Faul signed with the Tigers in 1962. Assigned to the Knoxville Smokies of the Sally League, he won six of eight decisions and posted a 2.10 earned run average. After a one-game major-league trial late in 1962, Faul spent the entire  season with the Tigers. Working as a swing man, he appeared in 28 games pitched, ten as a starter, won five of 11 decisions, had two complete games and one save.

But Faul also gained a reputation as one of his buttoned-up era's more free-spirited players and struggled under old-school manager Chuck Dressen after Dressen took command of the Tigers in mid-season. Faul spent all but one game of the  campaign in Triple-A, where he compiled an outstanding win–loss record (11–1) but a high earned run average (4.05) for the Syracuse Chiefs.

The deal set up Faul's most successful big-league campaign. It began inauspiciously when he was roughed up during an April relief appearance against his hometown team, the Cincinnati Reds. The outing earned Faul another trip to Triple-A, where he spent two months in the Pacific Coast League. Recalled in July and eventually plugged into the second-division Cubs' starting rotation, Faul worked in 17 games (including 16 starts), threw five complete games and three shutouts, including a two-hitter and a three-hitter. The 1965 Cubs tied a major league record by turning three triple plays, and Faul was the pitcher on each occasion. At one point that season, Faul credited the success he was having to his having the ability to hypnotize himself and batters. For the year, Faul posted a 6–6 record and set a personal best with a 3.54 earned run average.

He began  working out of the bullpen for the Cubs' new manager, Leo Durocher, but got a chance to start on May 1 against the Philadelphia Phillies at Wrigley Field. He defeated the Phils 6–1, registering what would be his final major league victory. He got in five more starts during the seasons first half, but was sent to Triple-A Tacoma in July. After spending 3 years in the minors, he surfaced in the majors again as a member of the Giants'  bullpen, appearing in seven May games and registering one save. Then he was sent back to Triple-A, where he toiled through 1971. After sitting out the 1972 campaign, he made a final comeback in the Cubs' organization in 1973 before retiring.

All told, Faul appeared in 71 big-league games, including 33 starting assignments, over all or parts of six seasons. He won 12 games, lost 16, with eight complete games, three shutouts, and two saves. In 261 innings pitched he allowed 247 hits and 97 bases on balls, with 164 strikeouts. His career ERA was 4.72.

Personal life and death
Faul was a resident of Pleasant Plain, Ohio. He died at age 61 and is survived by his brother Jerry who still resides in Ohio.

References

External links

1940 births
2002 deaths
All-American college baseball players
Baseball players from Cincinnati
Chicago Cubs players
Cincinnati Bearcats baseball players
Detroit Tigers players
Indianapolis Indians players
Knoxville Smokies players
Major League Baseball pitchers
Midland Cubs players
Omaha Royals players
Phoenix Giants players
People from Warren County, Ohio
Portland Beavers players
Salt Lake City Bees players
San Francisco Giants players
Syracuse Chiefs players
Tacoma Cubs players
Waterbury Indians players